The following is a timeline of the history of the city of San Francisco, California, United States.

Prior to the 1800s

 1776 – Presidio of San Francisco and Mission San Francisco de Asís established by colonists from Spain.
 1791 – Mission San Francisco de Asís building dedicated.

1800s
 1847
 Yerba Buena renamed "San Francisco."
 City hotel built.
 1848
 Territory ceded from Mexico to the United States per Treaty of Guadalupe Hidalgo.
 California Gold Rush begins.
 1849
 St. Francis hotel built.
 Boudin Bakery, Olympic Amphitheatre, and Union Iron Works in business.
 West Indian Benevolent Association established.
 1850
 April 15: City of San Francisco incorporated.
 May 1: John W. Geary becomes mayor.
 October 29: San Francisco becomes part of the new U.S. State of California.
 Chamber of Commerce Society of California Pioneers, and Jenny Lind Theatre established.
 Population: 34,000.
 1851
 May 3–4: Fire.
 San Francisco Committee of Vigilance organized.
 Pioneer Race Course opens.
 1852
 Ghirardelli in business.
 Mercantile Library Association of San Francisco, Sons of the Emerald Isle, and San Francisco Turn Verein established.
 The Golden Era newspaper begins publication.
 1853 – California Academy of Sciences, YMCA, and Russ garden established.
 1854 
 San Francisco Mechanics' Institute established.
 Lone Mountain Cemetery established
 1855 – Hebrew Young Men's Literary Assoc. active.
 1856 – Mirror of the Times and Daily Morning Call newspapers begin publication.
 1857 – California State Convention of Colored Citizens, a colored convention, held in city.
 1858 – Italian Benevolent Society organized.
 1859 – San Francisco Schuetzen-Verein founded.
 1860
 March 27: Japanese embassy arrives.
 Olympic Club founded.
 Population: 56,802.
 1861
 Overland Telegraph Company begins operating (New York-San Francisco).
 Fraternitas Rosae Crucis lodge established.
 1862
Heald's Business College and Franchise League established.
The San Francisco Stock and Bond Exchange was founded.
 1863
 San Francisco and San Jose Railroad begins operating soon.
 St. Andrew's Society founded.
 Cliff House rebuilt.
 Charlotte L. Brown sues a  racially segregated San Francisco streetcar company and wins.
 1864 –
Concordia-Argonaut Club founded.
 Hugh Toland found the Toland Medical College, which would later become the University of California, San Francisco
 1865 – Daily Examiner and Daily Dramatic Chronicle newspapers begin publication.
 1866 – Merchants' Exchange Association, Caledonian Club, and Woodward's Gardens established.
 1867
 Street begging ban effected.
 San Francisco City and County Almshouse opens.
 1868 – San Francisco County Medical Society and Women’s Co-operative Printing Office  established.
 1869
 California Theatre opens.
 San Francisco Yacht Club founded.
 Grand hotel built.
 Central Pacific Railroad line to Oakland completed.
 1870
 Golden Gate Park and San Francisco Microscopical Society established.
 Population: 149,473.
 1871 – San Francisco Art Association and St. Luke's Hospital established.
 1872 – Bohemian Club and Bar Association of San Francisco founded.
 1873
 Clay Street Hill Railroad begins operating.
 Polish Society of California organized.
 1874 – California School of Design, and Territorial Pioneers of California established.
 1875
 Palace Hotel in business.
 Fire patrol established.
 1876 
 Pioneer Park, Pacific Homeopathic Dispensary Association, and Ligue Nationale Francaise established.
  Railway connexion to Los Angeles.
 1877
 Board of Trade, Spanish Mutual Benevolent Society, and Workingmen's Party of California established.
Anti-Chinese sentiment leads to riots against Chinatown residents and businesses.
 Baldwin hotel built.
 1878 – San Francisco Public Library, Pacific Yacht Club, and Young Women's Christian Association founded.
 1879 – Golden Gate Kindergarten Association organized.
 1880 – California State Convention of Colored Citizens, a colored convention, held in city.
 1881 – Geographical Society of the Pacific organized.
 1883 – Pacific Coast Amateur Photographic Association headquartered in city.
 1887 – Cogswell Polytechnical College established.
 1888 – Associated Charities and San Francisco Business College established.
 1889 – Pacific-Union Club formed.
 1890 
 California Camera Club and University Club of San Francisco established.
 Population: 298,997.
 1891 – Gregg Shorthand school established.
 1892
 Hibernia Bank built.
 Trocadero Hotel opens.
 1893 – Mark Hopkins Institute of Art established.
 1894
 Wilmerding School of Industrial Arts established.
 California Midwinter International Exposition of 1894 held; Japanese Tea Garden built.
 1895
 California School of Mechanical Arts established.
 M. H. de Young Memorial Museum opens as Golden Gate Park Museum.
 1896 – Sutro Baths open.
 1898
 San Francisco Ferry Building opens.
 City rechartered.
 League of California Municipalities headquartered in city.
 Buddhist temple founded.
 1899
 San Francisco State Normal School established.
 City Hall built.
 1900 – Population: 342,782.

1900s

1900s–1940s

 1901
 Labor strike of restaurant workers.
 San Francisco Architectural Club organized.
 1902 – Eugene Schmitz becomes mayor.
 1905 – 1908: San Francisco graft trials
 1906 – April 18: Earthquake and fires.
 1907
 July: Mayor Eugene Schmitz imprisoned.
 International Hotel built.
 A. Mutt comic strip begins publication in the San Francisco Chronicle.
 1908 – South San Francisco incorporated near city.
 1910
 San Francisco Housing Association organized.
 Population: 416,912.
 1911
 San Francisco Symphony founded.
 Cort theatre opens.
 1912
 Lux School for Industrial Training for Girls opens.
 Book Club of California established.
 James Rolph becomes mayor.
 Tadich Grill in business.
 1914 – San Francisco National Guard Armory and Arsenal built.
 1915
 January 25: First transcontinental telephone call occurs (San Francisco-New York).
 February 20: Panama–Pacific International Exposition opens; Tower of Jewels built.
 San Francisco Labor Temple built.
 San Francisco City Hall rebuilt.
 Veterans Auditorium opens.
 1916
 Preparedness Day Bombing.
 Legal Aid Society established.
 Buena Vista Cafe in business.
 1917 – Strand Theater built.
 1922 – Golden Gate Theatre and Castro Theatre built.
 1923
 January: Mae Nolan becomes U.S. representative for California's 5th congressional district.
 August 2: US President Harding dies in the Palace Hotel.
 1924 – California Palace of the Legion of Honor opens.
 1925
 Fleishhacker Pool built.
 Florence Prag Kahn becomes U.S. representative for California's 4th congressional district.
 1926 – Playland at the Beach in business.
 1927 – San Francisco Municipal Airport dedicated.
 1928 – Amazon Theater opens.
 1929
 Fleishhacker Zoo established.
 Topsy’s Roost (restaurant) in business.
 1930 – Pacific Stock Exchange Lunch Club formed.
 1931 – Stern Grove opens as city park.
 1932
 War Memorial Opera House opens.
 Photographers' Group f/64 founded.
 1933
 San Francisco Opera Ballet founded.
 Coit Tower built.
 1934
 May 9: General Strike begins.
 U.S. Penitentiary established on Alcatraz Island.
 Golden Grain Macaroni Company in business.
 1935 – San Francisco Museum of Modern Art opens as San Francisco Museum of Art in Veterans Memorial Building.
 1936 – Bay Bridge opens.
 1937 – May 27: Golden Gate Bridge opens.
 1940 – Holly Courts housing project built.
 1944 – Church for the Fellowship of All Peoples established.
 1945
 Tonga Room in business.
 April 25: United Nations Conference on International Organization begins.
 June 26: United Nations Charter signed.
 1946 – National Urban League branch and Marines' Memorial Club established.
 1949 – Presidio Theatre built.

1950s–1990s

 1952 – The Purple Onion nightclub in business.
 1953 – City Lights Bookstore in business.
 1955 – City Lights Pocket Poets Series begins publication.
 Allen Ginsberg reads his  poem Howl for the first time at the Six Gallery
 1957
 San Francisco International Film Festival founded.
 Caffe Trieste in business.
 Sister city relationship established with Osaka, Japan.
 The San Francisco Stock and Bond Exchange (formed in 1882) and the Los Angeles Oil Exchange (formed in 1899) merge to create the Pacific Coast Stock Exchange. 
 1959 – Embarcadero Freeway opens.
 1960 – Mandarin restaurant in business.
 1963– The Reverend Cecil Williams becomes pastor at Glide Memorial Church, shifting the church's politics to the left.
 1964 – City's "San Francisco History Center" established.
 1965 – Intersection for the Arts incorporated.
The musical group the Jefferson Airplane is created.
 1966– The Compton's Cafeteria riot breaks out when transgender patrons become angry over police harassment.
 1967 – Summer of Love.
 January: The Human Be-In takes place in Golden Gate park, a prelude to the Summer of Love.
The anarchist group The Diggers is founded, and begins distributing free food.
 1968 – Sister city relationship established with Sydney, Australia.
 The Church of John Coltrane is established, and continues religious services until 2016.
 1969
 555 California Street built.
 Sister city relationships established with Assisi, Italy; and Taipei, Taiwan.
 The San Francisco Chronicle and Examiner receive their first letters from The Zodiac Killer.
 1970 – Regional Metropolitan Transportation Commission established.
 1971 – Peoples Temple in San Francisco and Church of the Tree of Life established.
 1972
 San Francisco Pride begins.
 Golden Gate National Recreation Area established.
 Transamerica Pyramid built.
 1973
 October: Zebra murders begin.
 Church of the Gentle Brothers and Sisters incorporated.
 Sister city relationship established with Haifa, Israel.
 1974
 People's Food System active (approximate date).
 Southern Exposure (art space) and San Francisco Cable Car Museum established.
 April 15: Hibernia Bank robbery by the Symbionese Liberation Army.
 1975
 Rainbow Grocery Cooperative opens.
 Sister city relationship established with Seoul, South Korea.
 September 22: Sara Jane Moore attempted to assassinate President Gerald Ford in front of the St. Francis Hotel by firing two gunshots at Ford; both shots missed.
 1976 – Bay Area Video Coalition founded.
 1977
 Theatre Rhinoceros and Suicide Club founded.
 Golden Dragon massacre
 San Francisco Planning and Urban Research Association active.
 1978
 June 25: Rainbow flag (LGBT movement) introduced.
 November 18: Jonestown mass murder-suicide at the People's Temple Guyana compound.
 November 27: Moscone–Milk assassinations.
 December 4: Dianne Feinstein becomes mayor.
 1979
The Sisters of Perpetual Indulgence make their first appearance on Castro Street.
 May 21: White Night riots.
 Sister city relationship established with Shanghai, China.
 1980 – Davies Symphony Hall opens.
 1981
 San Francisco Symphony Youth Orchestra and Hansberry Theatre established.
 Sister city relationship established with Manila, Philippines.
 1982 – City/county handgun ban approved; later struck down by state court.
 1983
 San Francisco General Hospital AIDS clinic established.
 The first San Francisco Historic Trolley Festival takes place.
 1984 – Sister city relationship established with Cork, Ireland.
 1986
 Cacophony Society formed.
  A bonfire of a wooden man is held on Baker Beach which evolves into the Burning Man event.
 Sister city relationship established with Abidjan, Côte d'Ivoire.
 1987 – Luggage Store (arts organization) established.
 1988 – San Francisco Museum and Historical Society founded.
 1989
 October 17: Loma Prieta earthquake.
 San Francisco becomes a sanctuary city for illegal immigrants.
 1990
 Population: 723,959.
 Sister city relationship established with Thessaloniki, Greece.
 1991 – Museum of the City of San Francisco opens.
 1992
 Critical Mass (bicycle event) began.
 Clarion Alley Mural Project organized.
 Latino Coalition for a Healthy California headquartered in city.
 1993 – Yerba Buena Center for the Arts opens.
 1993 – 101 California Street shooting occurs.
 1994 – Santarchy begins.
 1995
 Craigslist founded.
 Sister city relationship established with Ho Chi Minh City, Vietnam.
 1996
 City website online (approximate date).
 Willie Brown becomes mayor.
 Internet Archive headquartered in city.
 Long Now Foundation established.
 1997
 Sister city relationship established with Paris, France.
 Pinecrest Diner, a popular all-night diner-style restaurant in San Francisco, becomes notorious for a murder over an order of eggs.
 1998 – Wattis Institute for Contemporary Arts founded.
 2000 – Population: 776,733.

2000s
 2001 - Fatal dog mauling of Diane Whipple.
 2003
 Bernal Heights Preservation established.
 U.S. National Security Agency/AT&T Room 641A in operation.
 Sister city relationship established with Zürich, Switzerland.
 2004 – Gavin Newsom becomes mayor.
 2005 – November: Gun control ordinance San Francisco Proposition H (2005) passes; later struck down.
 2007
 Twitter Inc. in business.
 Noisebridge founded.
 2008
 Edible Schoolyard established at San Francisco Boys and Girls Club.
 One Rincon Hill (apartment building) constructed.
 Airbnb in business.
 2009
 The Millennium Tower opens, later sinking and tilting.
 Uber begins operating.
 FailCon begins.
 San Francisco Appeal begins publication.
 Sister city relationships established with Bangalore, India; and Kraków, Poland.
 2010
 The Bay Citizen and Ocean Beach Bulletin begin publication.
 Population: 805,235; metro 4,335,391.
 Sister city relationships established with Amman, Jordan; and Barcelona, Spain.
 2011
 January 11: Ed Lee becomes mayor.
 November 8: San Francisco mayoral election, 2011.
 TechCrunch Disrupt conference begins.
 2013
 San Francisco tech bus protests begin.
 Civic Industries in business.
 2014 – San Francisco Giants baseball team win World Series contest.
 2015 – Shooting of Kathryn Steinle.

See also
 History of San Francisco
 National Register of Historic Places listings in San Francisco, California
 List of pre-statehood mayors of San Francisco
 List of mayors of San Francisco (since 1850)
 Timelines of San Francisco's sister cities: Abidjan, Amman, Barcelona, Haifa, Kraków, Manila, Osaka,  Paris, Seoul, Shanghai, Sydney, Zürich
 Timeline of the San Francisco Bay Area
 Timelines of other cities in the Northern California area of California: Fresno, Mountain View, Oakland, Sacramento, San Jose

References

Bibliography

Published in the 1800s
 
 
 San Francisco (article) (1870) The Overland Monthly, January 1870 Vol. 4, No. 1, pp. 9–23. San Francisco: A. Roman & Co., Publishers

Published in the 1900s
1900s–1940s
 
 
 
 
 
 
 
 
 
 
 
 
 
 
 

1950s–1990s

Published in the 2000s

 
 
 Solnit, Rebecca. Infinite City: A San Francisco Atlas (University of California Press, 2010). 144 pp.

External links
 
 Digital Public Library of America. Items related to San Francisco, various dates
 

 
San Francisco-related lists
san francisco